Hagal is the 7th pseudo-rune of Armanen Futharkh of Guido von List, derived from the Younger Futhark Hagal rune .

Hagal is the "mother rune" of the Armanen system and also seen as such by List's contemporaries Jörg Lanz von Liebenfels, Adolf Schleipfer, Peryt Shou, Siegfried Adolf Kummer, Rudolf John Gorsleben, Friedrich Bernhard Marby, Werner von Bülow, Wilhelm Wulff and more recently Karl Spiesberger and Karl Hans Welz.

It is seen as the central axis point of the hexagonal crystal of which the Armanen runes are derived.

In one of its simple formats, it resembles the Wendehorn.

Notes

See also
Armanen runes
Julleuchter

References
 von List, Guido - Das Geheimnis der Runen, 1908 (GvLB no 1)
 von List, Guido - Die Religion der Ario-Germanen in ihrer Esoterik und Exoterik (1909 or 1910)
 John Gorsleben, Rudolf - Hoch-Zeit der Menschheit, 1930
 Kummer, Siegfried Adolf - Heilige Runenmacht, 1932
 Kummer, Siegfried Adolf - Runen-Magie,1933
 Flowers, Dr. Stephen E. and Moynihan, Michael - The Secret King (2001)
 Thorsson, Edred - Runemight, Runelore, Futhark
 Spiesberger, Karl - Runenmagie

External links
The Hagal Rune
The Hagal rune by Black Crescent
Hagal by the Rabenclan

Guido von List
Runes in Germanic mysticism